Fu Che-wei born December 21, 1973 (Tongyong Pinyin: Fù Ché-Wěi) is a Chinese Taipei professional pool player, nicknamed "the Draw Shot Prince."

Career
Fu made his first notable appearance when he finished among the top 32 competitors in the 2004 WPA World Nine-ball Championship (losing to Earl Strickland).  He made a comeback at the 2006 event, he was eventually eliminated by runner-up Ralf Souquet in the semi-finals. The performance would win earn him a place in the following years event, but was eliminated in the second round to Mika Immonen.

Che-Wei reached the final of the 2012 WPA World Eight-ball Championships; defeating Huidji See in the quarter finals 9–4, and Liu Haitao 9–3 in the semi-final, before losing in the final to Chang Jung-lin 11–6. Fu has also competed at the WPA World Ten-ball Championships, reaching the last 16 in 2008.

Titles
 2012 WPA World Team Championship

References

External links
 Fu Che-wei at AZBilliards.com

Living people
1973 births
Taiwanese pool players
Cue sports players at the 2002 Asian Games